Pitthea cunaxa  is a moth of the family Geometridae first described by Herbert Druce in 1887. It is found in the Democratic Republic of the Congo.

References

Ennominae
Fauna of the Republic of the Congo
Moths of Africa